Reginald Teagle (27 February 1909 – 8 June 1987) was an Australian cricketer. He played in two first-class matches for South Australia in 1930/31.

See also
 List of South Australian representative cricketers

References

External links
 

1909 births
1987 deaths
Australian cricketers
South Australia cricketers
Cricketers from Adelaide